Alver is a municipality in Vestland county, Norway. It is located in the traditional district of Nordhordland. The administrative centre of the municipality is the village of Knarvik. Other villages include Alversund, Alver, Isdalstø, Lindås, Ostereidet, Seim, Manger, Askeland, Austmarka, Bøvågen, Haugland, Sæbø, Sletta, Frekhaug, Hjartås, Holme, Io, Krossneset, Meland, and Rossland.

The  municipality is the 168th largest by area out of the 356 municipalities in Norway. Alver is the 37th most populous municipality in Norway with a population of 29,593.

General information

The municipality was established on 1 January 2020 when the three neighboring municipalities of Lindås, Radøy, and Meland were merged into one large municipality.

Name
The name of the municipality comes from the old Alver farm. The name has two parts "al" meaning "whole" and "viðra" meaning "weather", probably referring to the location which is exposed to the weather from all directions. mIt is the same root as the other local names like Alversund and Alverstraumen.

Coat of arms
The coat of arms was adopted in 2019 for use starting in 2020. The blue arms show a gray or white bridge and a boat passing beneath it. It symbolizes that the fact that bridges tie the municipality together and the boat has been a means of transportation in the area for centuries.

Churches
The Church of Norway has six parishes within the municipality of Alver. It is part of the Nordhordland prosti (deanery) in the Diocese of Bjørgvin.

Government
All municipalities in Norway, including Alver, are responsible for primary education (through 10th grade), outpatient health services, senior citizen services, unemployment and other social services, zoning, economic development, and municipal roads. The municipality is governed by a municipal council of elected representatives, which in turn elects a mayor.  The municipality falls under the Hordaland District Court and the Gulating Court of Appeal.

Municipal council
The municipal council  of Alver is made up of 47 representatives that are elected to four year terms. The party breakdown of the council is as follows:

Notable people 

 Carl Andreas Fougstad (1806 in Alverstraumen – 1871) lawyer, journalist, author, Mayor of Oslo
 Arne Bjørndal (1882 in Hosanger – 1965) a hardingfele fiddler, composer and folklorist
 Amund Rydland (1888 in Alversund – 1967) a stage and film actor and theatre director 
 Nils Hjelmtveit (1892 in Hopland – 1985) a Norwegian educator and politician
 Lars Amandus Aasgard (1907 in Lindås – 1984) furniture factory manager, politician and Mayor of Lindås 1951 to 1963 
 Torolv Solheim (1907 in Radøy – 1995) an educator, essayist, resistance member and politician
 Aslaug Låstad Lygre (1910 in Lindås – 1966) a Norwegian poet.
 Narve Bjørgo (born 1936 in Meland) a Norwegian historian and academic
 Magnar Mangersnes (born 1938 in Radøy) a Norwegian organist and choral conductor 
 Audun Sjøstrand (born 1950 in Radøy) a Norwegian journalist, teacher and crime fiction writer

Sport 
 Nils Sæbø (1897 in Radøy – 1985) an equestrian, competed at the 1936 Summer Olympics
 Lise Klaveness (born 1981 in Meland) a lawyer and footballer, 73 caps for the Norway women's football team
 Sindre Marøy (born 1982 in Hordabø) a Norwegian former professional footballer with over 100 club caps

References

External links
Municipal fact sheet from Statistics Norway 

 
Municipalities of Vestland
2020 establishments in Norway